Air Ukraine ( Avialiniyi Ukrayiny) was a state-owned airline from Ukraine, serving as flag carrier of the country from 1992 to 2002. Headquartered in Kyiv, Air Ukraine operated scheduled passenger and cargo flights mostly on domestic routes or within the Commonwealth of Independent States, but also to global destinations.

History

The Dissolution of the Soviet Union during 1990 and 1991 lead to the split-up of former Soviet carrier Aeroflot in 1992, with Air Ukraine being founded out of the Aeroflot's Kyiv directorate. Soon, other Ukrainian divisions were merged into it to create a national airline.

In December 2002, Air Ukraine was declared to be bankrupt. Attempts to relaunch the company by merging it with Aerosvit Airlines or Ukraine International Airlines failed, and the airline license was finally withdrawn on 23 July 2004.

Fleet
Over the years, Air Ukraine operated the following aircraft types:

Incidents
On 5 September 1992, the crew of an Air Ukraine Tupolev Tu-154 (registered CCCP-85269) with 147 people on board had to execute a belly-landing at Boryspil International Airport because the landing gear could not be deployed. The aircraft was damaged beyond repair.
On 23 January 1995, another Turbolet (registered UR-67115) was destroyed when it crashed on a frozen lake whilst approaching Provedenia Airport in Russia because of an engine failure. The three crew members on board had been on an empty ferry flight from Anadyr Airport, which was planned to continue onwards to Honduras, to where the aircraft had been sold. There were no fatalities.
On 4 April 1995, the pilots of an Air Ukraine Antonov An-26 (registered UR-26049) tried to take off from Palana Airport without having released the brakes. The aircraft thus was not able to get airborne, and overshot the runway, being damaged beyond economical repair. The nine people that had been on the chartered flight to Ust-Pakhachi Airport survived the accident.

References

External links

Defunct airlines of Ukraine
Former Aeroflot divisions
Airlines established in 1992
Airlines disestablished in 2004